Raj Bhavan (translation: Government House)  is the official residence of the governor of Telangana located in the city of Hyderabad, India. It is located at Somajiguda adjacent to Hussain Sagar lake.

History
It was designed and constructed in 1936 by Eric Marrett and Zain Yar Jung, during the reign of the last Nizam Mir Osman Ali Khan. The land area is about 21.50 acres (8.4 hectares).

The Nizam's Government acquired this estate of Nawab Shahzore Jung and Sayyad Akil Bilgrami for the Prime Minister's official residence of Princely state of Hyderabad. the estate consisted of two older buildings at the place where the present Durbar Hall is located. These were pulled down to make room for the subsequent new structures.

The earliest occupant of the Durbar Hall building was Sir Akbar Hydari, the Prime Minister of Hyderabad State from 1936 to 1941. But he stayed here for a short period and shifted his residence to an adjacent building which is now known as Dilkusha Guest House.

Subsequent Prime Ministers to stay here were the Nawab of Chattari (1941-1946 and May–November, 1947), Sir Mirza Ismail (August 1946 to May 1947), Sir Mehdi Yar Jung (November–December, 1947) and Mir Laik Ali, President of the Council of Interim Government (1947–48).

Shah Manzil
Shah Manzil, one of the pre-1914 building in Raj bhavan estate, is an architectural landmark and currently used as the office of the Advisors to Governor of Telangana.

References
 Official Website of the Governor of Telangana Retrieved 1 Oct 2020.
 History of Raj Bhavan, Hyderabad (Governor official Website) Retrieved 1 Oct 2020.

Governors' houses in India
Heritage structures in Hyderabad, India
Government buildings in Telangana
Buildings and structures in Hyderabad, India
Buildings and structures completed in 1936
Palaces of Nizams of Hyderabad
20th-century architecture in India